The following is a list of transfers for the 2014 Major League Soccer season.  On August 9, 2013, Juan Agudelo reached an agreement to join to English Premier League side Stoke City on a free transfer following the conclusion of the 2013 season.  However, on November 20, 2013, Stoke City announced that the deal fell through after Agudelo's work permit was denied.  Later on in the year, the LA Galaxy acquired Baggio Husidić from Swedish side Hammarby IF.  However, that move did not take effect until January 1, 2014.  The rest of the moves were made during the 2013–14 MLS offseason all the way through the roster freeze in September 2014.

Transfers 

 Player officially joined his new club on January 1, 2014.
 Only rights to player were acquired.
 Move involved a sign-and-trade deal with another club.

References

External links
 Official Site of Major League Soccer

2014

Major League
Major League